Jenny Camp was a famous horse that competed in the sport of eventing.

Jenny Camp is possibly the most famous US army-bred horse. Her sire, the Thoroughbred Gordon Russell, was well known for his jumping ability, although her dam was of unknown breeding (thought to be part-Thoroughbred, part-Standardbred). Gordon Russell also produced the 1952 bronze medal-winning jumper Democrat. She was poorly conformed, being short-gaited with upright front pasterns, but was found to be very brave and agile. Due to her small size, she was first used as a polo pony; when her jumping prowess was discovered, she was sent to be part of the three-day team.

The small mare was ridden by the great Captain Earl F. Thomson in two Olympics: the 1932 Los Angeles Games and the 1936 Berlin Games. She had great success, winning the individual silver medals at both Olympics as well as the team gold at the 1932 Games. This record makes her one of only three horses to win medals at consecutive Olympic Games; the others being Mark Todd's (NZ) Charisma and Marcroix, ridden by Holland's Lt. Charles F. Pahud de Mortanges.

Following her career, she was transferred to the Remount Depot at Fort Robinson to be bred.

Pedigree

References

External links
"Jenny Camp" - Photo

Eventing horses
Individual mares
Horses in the Olympics
1926 animal births